Carli is a nickname and given name. Notable people referred to by this name include the following:

Given name
 Carli Biessels (1936-2016), Dutch writer of children's literature
 Carli Hermès (born 1963), Dutch photographer and director
 Carli Lloyd, whose married name is Carli Anne Hollins (born 1982) American football player
 Carli Lloyd (volleyball), (born 1989), American volleyball player
 Carli Mosier, American voice actress and singer
 Carli Muñoz (born 1948), self-taught Puerto Rican jazz and rock pianist
 Carli de Murga (born 1988), Filipino footballer
 Carli Norris (born 1974), English actress
 Carli Renzi (born 1982), Australian judo competitor and wrestler
 Carli Tornehave (born 1932), Swedish singer and actor

Middle name
Carla Carli Mazzucato (born 1935), Italian artist

Fictional characters
Carli D'Amato, a character from British sitcom The Inbetweeners portrayed by Emily Head

See also

Cali (surname)
Cari (name)
Carl (name)
Carla
Carle, surnames
Carle (given name)
Carlie
Carlin (name)
Carlo (name)
Carly
Caroli (surname)
Carpi (surname)
Charli (disambiguation)
Carlia S. Westcott